Omar Abdul Aziz (born 26 December 1985) is a Nigerian football striker.

Honours
Liga Leumit:
Runner-up (2): 2004–05, 2008–09
Toto Cup (Leumit):
Winner (1): 2004–05

References

External links

Stats at Walla

1985 births
Living people
Nigerian footballers
Enyimba F.C. players
Maccabi Netanya F.C. players
Hapoel Jerusalem F.C. players
Hapoel Nof HaGalil F.C. players
Hapoel Acre F.C. players
Israeli Premier League players
Liga Leumit players
Association football forwards